Brodnicki (feminine: Brodnicka; plural: Brodniccy) is a surname of Polish-language origin. It means "of Brodnica" or "from Brodnica".

People 
 Ewa Brodnicka (born 1984), a Polish boxer
 Pascal Brodnicki (born 1976), a Polish-French cook

See also 
 Brodnica Landscape Park
 Brodnica County
 Kamionka Brodnicka
 Brodnica (disambiguation)
 Brudnicki, Brudnitzki

Polish-language surnames